Lee Byeong-nam (born 25 March 1964) is a South Korean fencer. He competed in the individual and team sabre events at the 1988 Summer Olympics.

References

External links
 

1964 births
Living people
South Korean male sabre fencers
Olympic fencers of South Korea
Fencers at the 1988 Summer Olympics
Asian Games medalists in fencing
Fencers at the 1986 Asian Games
Asian Games silver medalists for South Korea
Medalists at the 1986 Asian Games